The Kavli Foundation, based in Los Angeles, California, is a foundation that supports the advancement of science and the increase of public understanding and support for scientists and their work.

The Kavli Foundation was established in December 2000 by its founder and benefactor, Fred Kavli, a Norwegian business leader and philanthropist, who made his money by creating Kavlico, a company that made sensors, and by investing in real estate in southern California and Nevada. Kavli died in 2013, leaving the remainder of his wealth to the foundation. 

David Auston, a former president of Case Western Reserve University and former Bell Labs scientist, was the first president of the Kavli Foundation, from 2002 to 2009.  He was succeeded by Robert W. Conn, who was president from 2009 to 2020. Cynthia M. Friend is the third and current president. 

To date, The Kavli Foundation has made grants to establish Kavli Institutes on the campuses of 20 major universities. 
In addition to the Kavli Institutes, nine Kavli professorships have been established: three at Harvard University, two at University of California, Santa Barbara, one each at University of California, Los Angeles, University of California, Irvine, Columbia University, Cornell University, and California Institute of Technology.

The Kavli Prize

The Kavli Prize recognizes scientists for breakthroughs in three research areas: astrophysics, nanoscience and neuroscience.  Consisting of a scroll, medal and cash award of one million dollars, a prize in each of these areas has been awarded every two years since 2008. The Kavli Prize is a partnership among The Norwegian Academy of Science and Letters, The Norwegian Ministry of Education and Research, and The Kavli Foundation.

The recipients are chosen by three independent prize committees of distinguished scientists recommended by the Chinese Academy of Sciences, the French Academy of Sciences, the Max Planck Society, the U.S. National Academy of Sciences and The Royal Society. After making their selections, the recommendations of these prize committees are then confirmed by The Norwegian Academy of Science and Letters.

The Kavli Institutes

The Kavli Foundation's 20 institutes focus on astrophysics, nanoscience, neuroscience and theoretical physics.

Astrophysics
 The Kavli Institute for Particle Astrophysics and Cosmology at Stanford University
 The Kavli Institute for Cosmological Physics, University of Chicago
 The Kavli Institute for Astrophysics and Space Research at the Massachusetts Institute of Technology
 The Kavli Institute for Astronomy and Astrophysics at Peking University
 The Kavli Institute for Cosmology at the University of Cambridge
 The Kavli Institute for the Physics and Mathematics of the Universe at the University of Tokyo

Nanoscience
 The Kavli Institute for Nanoscale Science at Cornell University
 The Kavli Institute of Nanoscience at Delft University of Technology in the Netherlands
 The Kavli Nanoscience Institute at the California Institute of Technology
 The Kavli Energy NanoSciences Institute at University of California, Berkeley and the Lawrence Berkeley National Laboratory
 The Kavli Institute for NanoScience Discovery at the University of Oxford

Neuroscience
 The Kavli Institute for Brain Science at Columbia University
 The Kavli Institute for Brain & Mind at the University of California, San Diego
 The Kavli Institute for Neuroscience at Yale University
 The Kavli Institute for Systems Neuroscience at the Norwegian University of Science and Technology
 The Kavli Neuroscience Discovery Institute at Johns Hopkins University
 The Kavli Neural Systems Institute at The Rockefeller University
 The Kavli Institute for Fundamental Neuroscience at the University of California, San Francisco

Theoretical physics
 Kavli Institute for Theoretical Physics at the University of California, Santa Barbara
 The Kavli Institute for Theoretical Sciences (KITS) at the University of Chinese Academy of Sciences

References

External links
 The Kavli Foundation Website

Additional articles
 $1m prizes to complement Nobels, September 10, 2007 BBC News
 The Next Nobel? August 2, 2007 Time Magazine
 Donors Dream Big, August, 2007 Symmetry Magazine
 Kavli Strives to Leave Mark on Science, November 13, 2006 Associated Press
 Scientific American 50: Policy Leader of the Year, November 21, 2005 Scientific American
 He'll Pay for That, June, 2005 Scientific American
 A Philanthropist of Science Seeks to Be Its Next Nobel, April 19, 2005 The New York Times

Organizations established in 2000
Scientific research foundations in the United States
Non-profit organizations based in California